Aquatics Centre (or Center) may refer to:

London Aquatics Centre, venue during the 2012 Summer Olympics
Manchester Aquatics Centre, venue during the 2002 Commonwealth Games
Melbourne Sports and Aquatic Centre, venue during the 2006 Commonwealth Games
New Clark City Aquatic Center, venue during the 2019 Southeast Asian Games
Sydney Olympic Park Aquatic Centre, venue during the 2000 Summer Olympics
Tokyo Aquatics Centre, venue during the 2020 Summer Olympics held in 2021
Pan Am Sports Centre, venue during the 2015 Pan American Games

See also
Leisure centre
List of water sports
Swimming pool